Abbas Attiya Zwair (born 25 August 1969), commonly known as Abbas Attiya, is a coach and former Iraqi football player, who is currently a coach of Al-Kahrabaa FC.

Manager career 
Attiya led Al-Sinaat Al-Kahrabaiya in the beginning of the 2018-2019 season. He left the team signing for Al-Kahrabaa FC, which he leads now.

Statistics

Managerial statistics

Honours

Club
Al-Quwa Al-Jawiya
(Runner Up) 2014–15 Iraqi Premier League: 2014–15
Al-Kahrabaa FC
(Runner Up) 2018–19 Iraq FA Cup: 2018–19
Al-Hudood SC

2021–22 Iraq Division One

Country
Iraq U20
Qualified for 2016 AFC U-19 Championship: 2016
Quarter Final at 2016 AFC U-19 Championship: 2016 Lost to Saudi Arabia U20

References

Iraqi footballers
Iraq international footballers
Living people
1966 births
Association football defenders
Al-Quwa Al-Jawiya managers
Iraqi football managers